Hooyah is the battle cry used in the United States Navy and the United States Coast Guard to build morale and signify verbal acknowledgment. It originated with special forces communities, especially the Navy SEALs, and was subsequently adopted by other Navy divisions. 

It is comparable to Oorah in the United States Marine Corps and Hooah in the United States Army, the United States Air Force, and the United States Space Force.

"Hoorah" is also used by United States Navy Hospital Corpsmen, Religious Programs Specialist[RPs], Masters-at-Arms and Seabees because of their close association with the Marine Corps.

References

See also
 Hooah—the United States Army and United States Air Force equivalent
 Huzzah
 Oorah—the United States Marine Corps equivalent

Military slang and jargon
Interjections
Battle cries
English words